Disparida is an parvclass of extinct marine animals in the class Crinoidea. Disparids are a speciose and morphologically diverse group of crinoids distinguished by their monocyclic calyx and slender arms without pinnules. They range from the Early Ordovician (Tremadocian) to Middle Permian, reaching their highest diversity during the Late Ordovician.

While many disparids had a generalized shape typical of other stalked crinoids, some subgroups achieved strange forms. The long-lasting Calceocrinidae were recumbent forms, with a flattened crown bent back onto a stalk which rested on the seafloor. Other unusual disparid families include the armless Zophocrinidae, the spiral-armed Myelodactylidae, and the diminutive, simplified Pisocrinidae. Disparids have long been classified by the structure of their radial plates and different planes of symmetry, but a cumulative phylogenetic approach has failed to confirm the validity of many proposed subgroups. Nevertheless, Disparida itself is well-supported as a distinct monophyletic group.

Major traits of Disparida include:

 Small monocyclic calyx, without interbasal plates. Radial plates are proportionally large and may be compound (with multiple components), while basal plates are often reduced.
 Proximal branchial plates tend to fuse with their respective radials.
 Thin, uniserial arms without pinnules. Branching is typically frequent.
 Redevelopment of prominent bilateral symmetry via an axis aligned to one of the five rays making up the crown. This axis of symmetry may lie along the E ray (homocrinoid symmetry), D ray (heterocrinoid symmetry), C ray (isocrinoid symmetry), or A ray (crinoid/belemnocrinoid symmetry, which is developed to a lesser degree in other crinoids).
 Posterior plates lie above the C radial.

List of families and genera 
Disparida classification is undergoing revision. Many proposed families are paraphyletic or polyphyletic.

Family Acolocrinidae

 Acolocrinus
 Paracolocrinus

Family Allagecrinidae

 Allagecrinus
 Isoallagecrinus
 Kallimorphocrinus
 Litocrinus
 Metallagecrinus
 Wrightocrinus

Family Alphacrinidae

 Alphacrinus

Family Anamesocrinidae

 Anamesocrinus

Family Anomalocrinidae

 Anomalocrinus
 Geraocrinus

Family Aptocrinidae

 Othneiocrinus

Family Athenacrinidae

 Athenacrinus

Family Belemnocrinidae

 Belemnocrinus
 Whiteocrinus

Family Calceocrinidae

 Anulocrinus
 Calceocrinus
 Catatonocrinus
 Charactocrinus
 Chirocrinus
 Chiropinna
 Corvucrinus
 Cremacrinus
 Cunctocrinus
 Darraghcrinus
 Deltacrinus
 Diaphorocrinus
 Dolerocrinus
 Eohalysiocrinus
 Epihalysiocrinus
 Espanocrinus
 Grypocrinus
 Halysiocrinus
 Minicrinus
 Paracremacrinus
 Senariocrinus
 Stibarocrinus
 Synchirocrinus
 Trypherocrinus

Family Catillocrinidae

 Allocatillocrinus
 Catillocrinus
 Eucatillocrinus
 Kolvacrinus
 Isocatillocrinus
 Metacatillocrinus
 Mycocrinus
 Neocatillocrinus
 Notiocatillocrinus
 Paracatillocrinus
 Taucatillocrinus
 Ufacrinus
 Xenocatillocrinus

Family Cincinnaticrinidae (i.e. Heterocrinidae, paraphyletic / polyphyletic)

 Atyphocrinus
 Cincinnaticrinus
 Doliocrinus
 Dystactocrinus
 Glaucocrinus
 Heterocrinus
 Isotomocrinus
 Ohiocrinus
 Serendipocrinus
 Tenuicrinus
 Tryssocrinus

Family Columbicrinidae

 Columbicrinus
 Praecursoricrinus

Family Dulkumocrinidae

 Dulkumocrinus

Family Eustenocrinidae

 Cataractocrinus
 Coralcrinus
 Eustenocrinus
 Inyocrinus
 Peniculocrinus
 Pogonipocrinus
 Virucrinus

Family Haplocrinitidae

 Haplocrinites

Family Homocrinidae (paraphyletic / polyphyletic)

 Apodasmocrinus
 Bodacrinus
 Cataraquicrinus
 Daedalocrinus
 Difficilicrinus
 Drymocrinus
 Ectenocrinus
 Homocrinus
 Ibexocrinus
 Kastorcrinus
 Penicillicrinus
 Sygcaulocrinus
 Tunguskocrinus

Family Iocrinidae (paraphyletic)

 Caleidocrinus
 Grammocrinus
 Iocrinus
 Margoiocrinus
 Muicrinus
 Pariocrinus
 Peltacrinus
 Ristnacrinus
 Schaldichocrinus
 Tornatilicrinus
 Westheadocrinus

Family Maennilicrinidae

 Heviacrinus
 Maennilicrinus
 Putilovocrinus
 Vosekocrinus

Family Myelodactylidae

 Brachiocrinus
 Crinobrachiatus
 Eomyelodactylus
 Herpetocrinus
 Musicrinus
 Myelodactylus

Family Pisocrinidae

 Cicerocrinus
 Eocicerocrinus
 Parapisocrinus
 Pisocrinus
 Playfordicrinus
 Triacrinus
 Trichocrinus

Family Pygmaeocrinidae (polyphyletic)

 Kroppocrinus
 Pygmaeocrinus
 Storthingocrinus

Family Synbathocrinidae

 Abyssocrinus
 Phimocrinus
 Ramacrinus
 Stylocrinus
 Synbathocrinus
 Taidocrinus
 Theloreus

Family Tetragonocrinidae

 Ramseyocrinus
 Tetragonocrinus

Family Zophocrinidae

 Parazophocrinus
 Tiaracrinus
 Zophocrinus

Incertae sedis

 Agostocrinus?
 Aureocrinus
 Brutopisocrinus
 Calcycanthocrinus
 Changinocrinus
 Claviculacrinus
 Desmacriocrinus
 Gongrocrinus
 Heracrinus
 Holynocrinus
 Hypsocrinus
 Jaekelicrinus
 Junocrinus
 Macnamaratylus
 Paradoxocrinus
 Perissocrinus
 Perittocrinus?
 Quiniocrinus
 Regnellicrinus
 Resetocrinus
 Stereobrachicrinus
 Tetracionocrinus?
 Thaminocrinus
 Trophocrinus
 Xisoallegocrinus

References 

Prehistoric crinoids